is a passenger railway station  located in the city of  Nishinomiya, Hyōgo Prefecture, Japan. It is operated by the West Japan Railway Company (JR West).

Lines

Station layout
The station consists of two opposed elevated side platforms with station building underneath. The station is sandwiched between tunnels on both sides. Furthermore, part of the platform is on a bridge over the Najio River. The station consists of three levels: the top level is the entrance, the middle level is the pedestrian entrance and ticket gates, and the bottom level is the platform. The station has a Midori no Madoguchi staffed ticket office.

Platforms

Adjacent stations

History
Nishinomiya-Najio Sation opened on 1 November 1986. With the privatization of the Japan National Railways (JNR) on 1 April 1987, the station came under the aegis of the West Japan Railway Company.

Station numbering was introduced in March 2018 with Nishinomiya-Naijo being assigned station number JR-G58.

Passenger statistics
In fiscal 2016, the station was used by an average of 9188 passengers daily

Surrounding area
 Nishinomiya Najio New Town
 Shiose Central Park
 Shiose Community Center

See also
List of railway stations in Japan

References

External links 

  Nishinomiya-Najio Station from JR-Odekake.net 

Railway stations in Hyōgo Prefecture
Railway stations in Japan opened in 1986
Nishinomiya